Geraiyeh (also Romanized as Gerā’īyeh and Garā‘īyeh) is a village in Gheyzaniyeh Rural District, in the Central District of Ahvaz County, Khuzestan Province, Iran. At the 2006 census, its population was 151, in 27 families.

References 

Populated places in Ahvaz County